Continental Airlines Flight 11, registration N70775, was a Boeing 707 aircraft which exploded in the vicinity of Centerville, Iowa, while en route from O'Hare Airport, Chicago, Illinois, to Kansas City, Missouri, on May 22, 1962. The aircraft crashed in a clover field near Unionville, in Putnam County, Missouri, killing all 45 crew and passengers on board. The investigation determined the cause of the crash was a suicide bombing committed as insurance fraud.

Crash

The perpetrator, Thomas G. Doty, arrived at the gate just moments before departure.

Flight 11 departed O'Hare at 8:35 p.m. The flight crew consisted of Captain Fred R. Gray (50), First Officer Edward J. Sullivan (41), Flight Engineer Roger D. "Jack" Allen (32), and five flight attendants. The flight was routine until just before the Mississippi River when it deviated from its filed flight plan to the north to avoid a line of thunderstorms. In the vicinity of Centerville, Iowa, the radar image of the aircraft disappeared from the scope of the Waverly, Iowa, Flight Following Service. At approximately 9:17 p.m. an explosion occurred in the right rear lavatory, resulting in the separation of the tail section from the fuselage. The flight crew initiated the required emergency descent procedures and donned their smoke masks due to the dense fog that formed in the cabin immediately after decompression. Following the separation of the tail, the remaining aircraft structure pitched nose down violently, causing the engines to tear off, after which it fell in uncontrolled gyrations. The fuselage of the Boeing 707, minus the aft , and with part of the left and most of the right wing intact, struck the ground, headed westerly down a 10-degree slope of an alfalfa field.

Witnesses in and around both Cincinnati, Iowa and Unionville reported hearing loud and unusual noises at around 9:20 p.m. Two more saw a big flash or ball of fire in the sky. The aircraft commander saw a bright flash in the sky forward and above his aircraft's position. After referring to his navigation logs, he estimated the flash to have occurred at 9:22 p.m. near the location where the last radar target of Flight 11 had been seen.

Of the 45 individuals on board, 44 were dead when rescuers reached the crash site. One passenger, a 27-year-old man from Evanston, Illinois, died of internal injuries at Saint Joseph Mercy Hospital in Centerville, Iowa, an hour and a half after being rescued.

Investigation
FBI agents discovered that Doty, a married man with a five-year-old daughter, had purchased a life insurance policy from Mutual of Omaha for $150,000 (roughly equivalent to $ in 2022), the maximum available; his death would also bring in another $150,000 in additional insurance (some purchased at the airport) and death benefits. Doty was about to appear in court on an armed robbery charge. Doty had purchased six sticks of dynamite shortly before the flight, took them into the lavatory in his briefcase, and ignited them. His motive was that his wife and daughter would collect on the $300,000 of life insurance. His widow attempted to collect on the insurance, but the policy was voided when Doty's death was ruled a suicide.

In July 2010, a memorial was erected near the crash site in Unionville, Missouri on the anniversary of the crash.

In May 2012, a special 50th-anniversary memorial service was held in Unionville.

In popular culture
 Flight 11 is dramatized in Aircrash Confidential.
 The event partially inspired Arthur Hailey's novel Airport.

See also

 1962 in aviation
 Aviation safety
 National Airlines Flight 967  U.S. on November 16, 1959 killing 42 (Suspected bombing for insurance fraud)
 National Airlines Flight 2511, US - 1960 in-flight suicide bombing for insurance fraud
 Canadian Pacific Flight 108, Canada – 1949 in-flight bombing for murder and insurance fraud
 China Northern Airlines Flight 6136, China – 2002 in-flight arson caused by insurance fraud
 Federal Express Flight 705, US - 1994 attempted in-flight hijacking for insurance fraud that was foiled by the aircraft's crew
 List of accidents and incidents involving commercial aircraft
 United Airlines Flight 629, US – 1955 in-flight bombing for murder and insurance fraud
 Comair Flight 206

References

External links

DePuy, Charles B. "The untold story of Continental Flight 11." Daily Iowegian at Journal Express. May 22, 2012.

 

Aviation accidents and incidents in the United States in 1962
Explosions in 1962
11
1962 murders in the United States
1962 in Missouri
Mass murder in 1962
Airliner accidents and incidents in Missouri
Putnam County, Missouri
Suicide bombings in the United States
Disasters in Missouri
Murder–suicides in the United States
Accidents and incidents involving the Boeing 707
Airliner bombings in the United States
Crimes in Missouri
May 1962 events in the United States